Trachycarpus fortunei, the Chinese windmill palm, windmill palm or Chusan palm, is a species of hardy evergreen palm tree in the family  Arecaceae, native to parts of China, Japan, Myanmar and India.

Description
Its texture is very rough, with the persistent leaf bases clasping the stem as layers of coarse fibrous material. The leaves have long petioles which are bare except for two rows of small spines, terminating in a rounded fan of numerous leaflets. It is a somewhat variable plant, especially as regards its general appearance; and some specimens are to be seen with leaf segments having straight and others having drooping tips.

Distribution and habitat
This plant has been cultivated in China and Japan for thousands of years. This makes tracking its natural range difficult.

Due to its widespread use as an ornamental plant, the palm has become naturalised in southern regions of Switzerland, and has become an invasive species of concern.

Windmill palm is one of the hardiest palms. However, it is not the northernmost naturally occurring palm in the world, as European fan palm (Chamaerops humilis) grows further north in the Mediterranean.

Uses
Trachycarpus fortunei has been cultivated in China and Japan for thousands of years, for its coarse but very strong leaf sheath fibre, used for making rope, sacks, and other coarse cloth where great strength is important. The extent of this cultivation means that the exact natural range of the species is uncertain.

Cultivation

Trachycarpus fortunei is cultivated as a trunking palm in gardens and parks throughout the world in warm temperate and subtropical climates. Its tolerance of cool summers and cold winters makes it highly valued by palm enthusiasts, landscape designers and gardeners. It is grown successfully in cool climates such as the UK, France, Belgium, The Netherlands, western Poland as well as southern and western Germany. In the UK it has gained the Royal Horticultural Society's Award of Garden Merit.

In North America, mature specimens can be found growing in the coastal areas of the Pacific Northwest, the upper southern states, and Mid-Atlantic states.

Young plants are less hardy, and can be damaged by only .

The cultivar group Trachycarpus fortunei 'Wagnerianus' is a small-leafed semi-dwarf variant of the species selected in cultivation in China and Japan. It has often been treated as a separate species T. wagnerianus in popular works, but is now included within T. fortunei.

Sokolov et al., 2016 found one healthy specimen in Plovdiv, Bulgaria. Individuals of the T. f. '' subspecies have lived outside in the Connecticut town of  Woodbury continuously since the early 2000s with protection, where some winters have reached .

Nomenclature
The species was brought from Japan (Dejima) to Europe by the German physician Philipp Franz von Siebold in 1830. The common name refers to Chusan Island (now Zhoushan Island), where Robert Fortune first saw cultivated specimens. In 1849, Fortune smuggled plants from China to the Kew Horticultural Gardens and the Royal garden of Prince Albert of the United Kingdom. It was later named Trachycarpus fortunei, after him. It was first described by Carl Friedrich Philipp von Martius in 1850 in his Historia Naturalis Palmarum but under the illegitimate name of Chamaerops excelsa.

The names Chamaerops excelsus and Trachycarpus excelsus have occasionally been misapplied to Trachycarpus fortunei; these are correctly synonyms of Rhapis excelsa, with the confusion arising due to a misunderstanding of Japanese vernacular names.

See also
Hardy palms

Gallery

References

Further reading
Beccari, Odoardo: 1905 "Le Palme del Genere Trachycarpus", Webbia; I
Beccari, Odoardo: 1920 "Recens Palme Vecchio Mondo", Webbia; V
Beccari, Odoardo: 1931 "Asiatic Palms, Corypheae", Annals of the Royal Bot. Gard. Calcutta; 13
Martius, Carl Friedrich Philipp von: 1850 Historia Naturalis Palmarum, Band 3
Stührk, Chris: 2006 "Molekularsystematische Studien in der Subtribus Thrinacinae, mit besonderer Berücksichtigung der Gattung Trachycarpus H. Wendl". (Arecaceae)

fortunei
Trees of Myanmar
Trees of China
Trees of Japan
Plants described in 1861
Garden plants of Asia
Ornamental trees